Senator Warren may refer to:

United States

Members of the U.S. Senate
Elizabeth Warren (born 1949), senator from Massachusetts (2013-)
Francis E. Warren (1844–1929), senator from Wyoming (1890–1893, 1895–1929)

United States state senate members
Charles Henry Warren (1798–1874), Massachusetts State Senate
Fitz Henry Warren (1816–1878), Iowa State Senate
George Washington Warren (1813–1883), Massachusetts State Senate
Lindsay Carter Warren (1889–1976), Virginia State Senate
Lloyd Earl Warren (1896–1934), Virginia State Senate
Lott Warren (1797–1861), Georgia State Senate
Moses Warren (1779–1845), New York State Senate
Rebekah Warren (born 1971), Michigan State Senate
Robert D. Warren Sr. (1928–2013), North Carolina State Senate 
Robert W. Warren (1925–1998), Wisconsin State Senate